Dinoša is a village in the municipality of Tuzi, Montenegro. It is one of several settlements part of the historical tribal region known as Gruda, inhabited by a majority of ethnic Albanians.

Demographics 
According to the 2011 census, its population was 500.

Demographic history

In 1941, there were 308 Muslims and 69 Roman Catholics in the village.

See also
Dinoša mulberry tree

References

Populated places in Tuzi Municipality
Albanian communities in Montenegro